The Forth Bridge is a cantilever railway bridge across the Firth of Forth in the east of Scotland,  west of central Edinburgh. Completed in 1890, it is considered a symbol of Scotland (having been voted Scotland's greatest man-made wonder in 2016), and is a UNESCO World Heritage Site. It was designed by English engineers Sir John Fowler and Sir Benjamin Baker. It is sometimes referred to as the Forth Rail Bridge (to distinguish it from the adjacent Forth Road Bridge), although this has never been its official name.

Construction of the bridge began in 1882 and it was opened on 4 March 1890 by the Duke of Rothesay, the future Edward VII. When it opened it had the longest single cantilever bridge span in the world, until 1919 when the Quebec Bridge in Canada was completed.

The bridge and its associated railway infrastructure are owned by Network Rail.

Background

Earlier proposals

Before the construction of the bridge, ferries were used to cross the Firth. In 1806, a pair of tunnels, one for each direction, was proposed, and in 1818 James Anderson produced a design for a three-span suspension bridge close to the site of the present one.

For the railway age, Thomas Bouch designed for the Edinburgh and Northern Railway a roll-on/roll-off ferry between Granton and Burntisland that opened in 1850, which proved so successful that another was ordered for the Tay. In late 1863, a joint project between the North British Railway and Edinburgh and Glasgow Railway, which would merge in 1865, appointed Stephenson and Toner to design a bridge for the Forth, but the commission was given to Bouch around six months later.

The promoters, however, were concerned about the ability to set foundations in the silty river bottom, as borings had gone as deep as  into the mud without finding any rock, but Bouch conducted experiments to demonstrate that it was possible for the silt to support considerable weight. In August 1865, Richard Hodgson, chairman of the NBR, proposed that the company invest  to try a different kind of foundation, as the weighted caissons had not been successful. The platform was launched on 14 June 1866 after some difficulty in getting it to move down the greased planks it rested on, and then moored in the harbour for six weeks pending completion. The bridge project was aborted just before the platform was sunk as the NBR expected to lose "through traffic" following the amalgamation of the Caledonian Railway and the Scottish North Eastern Railway. In September 1866, a committee of shareholders investigating rumours of financial difficulties found that accounts had been falsified, and the chairman and the entire board had resigned by November. By mid-1867 the NBR was nearly bankrupt, and all work on the Forth and Tay bridges was stopped.

The North British Railway took over the ferry at Queensferry in 1867, and completed a rail link from Ratho in 1868, establishing a contiguous link with Fife. Interest in bridging the Forth increased again, and Bouch proposed a stiffened steel suspension bridge on roughly the line of the present rail bridge in 1871, and after careful verification, work started in 1878 on a pier at Inchgarvie.

After the Tay Bridge collapsed in 1879, confidence in Bouch dried up and the work stopped. The public inquiry into the disaster, chaired by Henry Cadogan Rothery, found the Tay Bridge to be "badly designed, badly constructed and badly maintained", with Bouch being "mainly to blame" for the defects in construction and maintenance and "entirely responsible" for the defects in design.

Bouch's design was formally abandoned on 13 January 1881, and Sir John Fowler, W. H. Barlow and T. E. Harrison, consulting engineers to the project, were invited to give proposals for a bridge.

Design

Dimensions
Each main span consists of two  cantilever arms supporting a central  span truss. The bridge also used  of granite.

Engineering principles

The bridge is built on the principle of the cantilever bridge, where a cantilever beam supports a light central girder, a principle that has been used for thousands of years in the construction of bridges. In order to illustrate the use of tension and compression in the bridge, a demonstration in 1887 had the Japanese engineer Kaichi Watanabe supported between Fowler and Baker sitting in chairs. Fowler and Baker represent the cantilevers, with their arms in tension and the sticks under compression, and the bricks the cantilever end piers which are weighted with cast iron.

Materials
The bridge was the first major structure in Britain to be constructed of steel; its French contemporary, the Eiffel Tower, was built of wrought iron.
Large amounts of steel became available after the invention of the Bessemer process, patented in 1856.

When modifications to the design necessitated a further , about half of this was supplied by the Steel Company of Scotland Ltd. and half by Dalzell's Iron and Steel Works in Motherwell. About  of rivets came from the Clyde Rivet Company of Glasgow. Around three or four thousand tons of steel was scrapped, some of which was used for temporary purposes, resulting in the discrepancy between the quantity delivered and the quantity erected.

Approaches

After Dalmeny railway station, the track curves very slightly to the east before coming to the southern approach viaduct. After the railway crosses the bridge, it passes through North Queensferry railway station, before curving to the west, and then back to the east over the Jamestown Viaduct.

The approaches were built under separate contract and were to the design of the engineer James Carswell. The supports of the approach viaducts are tapered to prevent the impression of the columns widening as they approach the top, and an evaluation of the aesthetics of the Bridge in 2007, by A D Magee of the University of Bath, identified that order was present throughout, and this included in the approach viaducts. Magee points out that the masonry was carefully planned, and has neat block work even in areas not immediately visible from the ground.

Construction

The Bill for the construction of the bridge was passed on 19 May 1882 after an eight-day enquiry, the only objections being from rival railway companies. On 21 December, the contract was let to Sir Thomas Tancred, Mr. T. H. Falkiner and Mr. Joseph Philips, civil engineers and contractor, and Sir William Arrol & Co. Arrol was a self-made man, who had been apprenticed to a blacksmith at the age of thirteen before going on to have a highly successful business. Tancred was a professional engineer who had worked with Arrol before, but he would leave the partnership during the course of construction.

The steel was produced by Frederick and William Siemens (England) and Pierre and Emile Martin (France). Following advances in furnace design by the Siemens brothers and improvements by the Martin brothers, the process of manufacture enabled high quality steel to be produced very quickly.

Preparations

The new works took possession of offices and stores erected by Arrol in connection with Bouch's bridge; these were expanded considerably over time. Reginald Middleton took an accurate survey to establish the exact position of the bridge and allow the permanent construction work to commence.

The old coastguard station at the Fife end had to be removed to make way for the north-east pier.

The preparations at South Queensferry were much more substantial, and required the steep hillside to be terraced. Wooden huts and shops for the workmen were put up, as well as more substantial brick houses for the foremen and tenements for leading hands and gangers. Drill roads and workshops were built, as well as a drawing loft  to allow full size drawings and templates to be laid out. A cable was also laid across the Forth to allow telephone communication between the centres at South Queensferry, Inchgarvie, and North Queensferry, and girders from the collapsed Tay Bridge were laid across the railway to the west in order to allow access to the ground there.

In April 1883, construction of a landing stage at Inchgarvie commenced. In 1884 a compulsory purchase order was obtained for the island, as it was found that previously available area enclosed by the four piers of the bridge was insufficient for the storage of materials.

Movement of materials

Many materials, including granite from Aberdeen, Arbroath rubble, sand, timber, and sometimes coke and coal, could be taken straight to the centre where they were required. Steel was delivered by train and prepared at the yard at South Queensferry, painted with boiled linseed oil, and was then taken to where it was needed by barge. The cement used was Portland cement manufactured on the Medway.

For a time a paddle steamer was hired for the movement of workers, but after a time it was replaced with one capable of carrying 450 men, and the barges were also used for people carrying. Special trains were run from Edinburgh and Dunfermline, and a steamer ran to Leith in the summer.

Circular piers

The three towers of the cantilever are each seated on four circular piers. Since the foundations were required to be constructed at or below sea level, they were excavated with the assistance of caissons and cofferdams. Caissons were used at locations that were either always under water, even at low tide, or where the foundations were to be built on mud and clay. Cofferdams were used where rock was nearer to the surface, and it was possible to work in low tide.

Six caissons were excavated by the pneumatic process, by the French contractor L. Coisea.

These caissons were constructed and assembled in Glasgow by the Arrol Brothers, namesakes of but unconnected to W. Arrol, before being dismantled and transported to South Queensferry. The caissons were then built up to a large extent before being floated to their final resting-places. The first caisson, for the south-west pier at South Queensferry was launched on 26 May 1884, and the last caisson was launched on 29 May 1885 for the south-west pier at Inchgarvie. When the caissons had been launched and moored, they were extended upwards with a temporary portion in order to keep water out and allow the granite pier to be built when in place.

Inchgarvie
The rock on which the two northern piers at Inchgarvie are located is submerged at high water, and of the other two piers, the site of eastern one is about half submerged and the western one three-quarters submerged. This meant work initially had to be done at low tide.

The southern piers on Inchgarvie are sited on solid rock with a slope of around 1 in 5, so the rock was prepared with concrete and sandbags to make a landing-spot for the caissons. Excavation was carried out by drilling and blasting, but no blasting was done within  of the caissons, and the remaining rock was quarried to within .

North Queensferry
The south piers at North Queensferry are sited on rock sloping into the sea, and the site was prepared by diamond drilling holes for explosive charges and blasting the rock.

South Queensferry

The four South Queensferry caissons were all sunk by the pneumatic method, and are identical in design except for differences in height. A T shaped jetty was built at the site of the South Queensferry piers, to allow one caisson to be attached to each corner, and when launched the caissons were attached to the jetty and permitted to rise and fall with the tide. Excavation beneath the caissons was generally only carried out at high tide when the caisson was supported by buoyancy, and then when the tide fell the air pressure was reduced in order to allow the caisson to sink down, and digging would begin anew.

The north-west caisson was towed into place in December 1884, but an exceptionally low tide on New Year's Day 1885 caused the caisson to sink into the mud of the river bed and adopt a slight tilt. When the tide rose, it flooded over the lower edge, filling the caisson with water, and when the tide fell but the water did not drain from the caisson, its top-heaviness caused to tilt further. It was decided to construct a "barrel" of large timbers inside the caisson to reinforce it, and it was ten months before the caisson could be pumped out and dug free. The caisson was refloated on 19 October 1885, and then moved into position and sunk with suitable modifications.

Approach viaducts
Two spans are attached together to make a continuous girder, with an expansion joint between each pair of spans. Due to the slope of the hill under the viaducts, the girders were assembled at different heights, and only joined when they had reached the same level. Lifting was done using large hydraulic rams, and took place in increments of around  every four days.

Building the cantilevers
The tubular members were constructed in the No. 2 workshop further up the hill at South Queensferry. To bend plates into the required shape, they were first heated in a gas furnace, and then pressed into the correct curve. The curved plates were then assembled on a mandrel, and holes drilled for rivets, before they were marked individually and moved to the correct location to be added to the structure. Lattice members and other parts were also assembled at South Queensferry, using cranes and highly efficient hydraulic rivetters.

Opening
The bridge was completed in December 1889, and load testing of the completed bridge was carried out on 21 January 1890. Two trains, each consisting of three heavy locomotives and 50 wagons loaded with coal, totalling 1,880 tons in weight, were driven slowly from South Queensferry to the middle of the north cantilever, stopping frequently to measure the deflection of the bridge. This represented more than twice the design load of the bridge: the deflection under load was as expected. A few days previously there had been a violent storm, producing the highest wind pressure recorded to date at Inchgarvie, and the deflection of the cantilevers had been less than 25 mm (1 in). The first complete crossing took place on 24 February, when a train consisting of two carriages carrying the chairmen of the railway companies involved made several crossings. The bridge was opened on 4 March 1890 by the Duke of Rothesay, later King Edward VII, who drove home the last rivet, which was gold plated and suitably inscribed. The key for the official opening was made by Edinburgh silversmith John Finlayson Bain, commemorated in a plaque on the bridge. When it opened it had the longest single cantilever bridge span in the world, until 1919 when the Quebec Bridge in Canada was completed.

To make the fullest use of the bridge, several new railway connections were built, bringing main line routes to the bridge. The construction of some of these lines was only completed on 2 June 1890, delaying the implementation of a full express train service over the bridge until that date. Even then, there was considerable congestion at Edinburgh Waverley station with remarshalling of the portions of the new, more intensive train service.

Accidents and deaths
At its peak, approximately 4,600 workers were employed in the bridge's construction. Wilhelm Westhofen recorded in 1890 that 57 people died. In 2005 the Forth Bridge Memorial Committee was set up to erect a monument to those lost, and a team of local historians set out to name all those who died. As of 2009, 73 deaths have been connected with the construction of the bridge and its immediate aftermath. It is thought that the figure of 57 deaths excluded those who died working on the approaches to the bridge, as those parts were completed by a subcontractor, as well as those who died after the Sick and Accident Club stopped. Of the 73 recorded deaths, 38 were as a result of falling, 9 of being crushed, 9 drowned, 8 struck by a falling object, 3 died in a fire in a bothy, 1 of caisson disease, and the cause of five deaths is unknown.

The Sick and Accident Club was founded in 1883, and membership was compulsory for all contractors' employees. It would provide medical treatment to men and sometimes their families, and pay them if they were unable to work. The club also paid for funerals within certain limits, and would provide grants to the widows of men killed or the wives of those permanently disabled. Eight men were saved from drowning by rowing boats positioned in the river under the working areas.

In 2019, it was reported historians of the Queensferry Historian Group had discovered at least 21 more men died building the Forth Bridge than was previously thought, in an alleged "cover up" of the true human cost of the structure, taking the new death toll to 78. Tragically, this arguably makes the Forth Bridge a more deadly structure than the failed Tay Bridge when counting both the 59 known deaths attributed to the Tay Bridge Disaster, that led to the earlier proposal for the Forth Bridge construction being halted and subsequently redesigned, combined with the 14 deaths during its construction.

Later history

Race to the North
With competition opened up along the east coast route from the Great Northern, North Eastern and North British railways and starting from King's Cross, unofficial racing took place between the two consortia, reducing the journey time to about 8 hours on the overnight runs. This reached a climax in 1895 with sensational daily press reports about the "Race to the North". When race fever subsided the journey times became around 10 hours.

World wars

In the First World War British sailors would time their departures or returns to the base at Rosyth by asking when they would pass under the bridge. The first German air attack on Britain in the Second World War took place over the Forth Bridge, six weeks into the war, on 16 October 1939. Although known as the "Forth Bridge Raid", the bridge was not the target and not damaged. The Germans were hoping to find , the largest capital ship in the Royal Navy. Luftwaffe rules of engagement restricted action to targets on water and not in the dockyard. The destroyer Mohawk and the cruisers, Southampton and Edinburgh were damaged. Sixteen Royal Navy crew died and 44 were wounded, although this information was not made public at the time.

Spitfires from 603 "City of Edinburgh" Squadron RAF intercepted the raiders and during the attack shot down the first German aircraft downed over Britain in the war. One bomber came down in the water off Port Seton on the East Lothian coast and another off Crail on the coast of Fife. After the War it was learned that a third bomber had come down in the Netherlands as a result of damage inflicted during the raid. Later in the month, a reconnaissance Heinkel 111 crashed near Humbie in East Lothian and photographs of this crashed plane were, and still are, used erroneously to illustrate the raid of 16 October, thus sowing confusion as to whether a third aircraft had been brought down. Members of the bomber crew at Port Seton were rescued and made prisoners-of-war. Two bodies were recovered from the Crail wreckage and after a full military funeral with firing party, were interred in Portobello cemetery, Edinburgh. The body of the gunner was never found. A wartime propaganda film, Squadron 992, made by the GPO Film Unit after the raid, recreated it and conveyed the false impression that the main target was the bridge.

Ownership

The only alternative route between Edinburgh and Fife involved the ferry at Queensferry, which was purchased by the NBR in 1867. Accordingly, the NBR sponsored the Forth Bridge project which would give them a direct link independent of the Caledonian Railway. A conference at York in 1881 set up the Forth Bridge Railway Committee, to which the NBR contributed 35% of the cost. The remaining money came from three English railways, which ran trains from London over NBR tracks. This body undertook to construct and maintain the bridge.

In 1882 the NBR were given powers to purchase the bridge, which it never exercised. At the time of the 1923 Grouping, the bridge was still jointly owned by the same four railways, and so it became jointly owned by these companies' successors, the London Midland and Scottish Railway (30%) and the London and North Eastern Railway (70%). The Forth Bridge Railway Company was named in the Transport Act 1947 as one of the bodies to be nationalised and so became part of British Railways on 1 January 1948. Under the Act, Forth Bridge shareholders would receive £109 of British Transport stock for each £100 of Forth Bridge Debenture stock; and £104 17s 6d of British Transport stock for each £100 of Forth Bridge Ordinary stock.

As of April 2017, the bridge and its associated railway infrastructure are owned by Network Rail Infrastructure Limited.

Operation

Traffic
The route availability code is RA8, but freight trains above a certain size must not pass each other on the bridge. Up to 190–200 trains per day crossed the bridge in 2006.

Maintenance

"Painting the Forth Bridge" is a colloquial expression for a never-ending task, coined on the erroneous belief that at one time in the history of the bridge repainting was required and commenced immediately upon completion of the previous repaint. Such a practice never existed, as weathered areas were given more attention, but there was a permanent maintenance crew. In 2011, the bridge was covered in a new coating designed to last for 25 years, bringing an end to having painters as a regular part of the maintenance crew. Colin Hardie, of Balfour Beatty Construction, was reported as saying,

Restoration
Floodlighting was installed in 1990, and the track was renewed between 1992 and 1995. The bridge was costing British Rail £1 million a year to maintain, and they announced that the schedule of painting would be interrupted to save money, and the following year, upon privatisation, Railtrack took over. A £40 million package of works commenced in 1998, and in 2002 the responsibility of the bridge was passed to Network Rail.

Work started in 2002 to repaint the bridge fully for the first time in its history, in a £130 million contract awarded to Balfour Beatty. The bridge was encapsulated in a climate controlled membrane to give the proper conditions for the application of the paint. The top coat can be reapplied indefinitely, minimising future maintenance work.

In a report produced by JE Jacobs, Grant Thornton and Faber Maunsell in 2007 which reviewed the alternative options for a second road crossing, it was stated that "Network Rail has estimated the life of the bridge to be in excess of 100 years. However, this is dependant  upon NR's inspection and refurbishment works programme for the bridge being carried out year on year".

In culture

In the media
The Forth Bridge has been featured in television programmes and films, including Carry On Regardless, Alfred Hitchcock's 1935 film The 39 Steps, and its 1959 remake. A.G. Barr used the bridge in posters advertising its soft drink Irn-Bru, with the slogan: "Made in Scotland, from girders". In 2005, the BBC lit the Bridge in red for Comic Relief. Also in 2005, Channel 4 documentary Jump Britain showed Sébastien Foucan, a French freerunner, crawling along one of the highest points of the bridge without a harness. The first episode of the UK television series Britain's Greatest Bridges featured the Forth Bridge and was aired on Spike UK on 12 January 2017.

In general culture 
The location of the Forth Bridge has seen it featured in other cultural forms. In the build up to the Millennium celebrations a countdown clock sponsored by the Royal Bank of Scotland was attached to the top of the Bridge in 1998. Iain Banks wrote the novel The Bridge, which is mainly set on a fictionalised version of the bridge, which links "The City" (Edinburgh) and "The Kingdom" (Fife). In Alan Turing's most famous paper about artificial intelligence, one of the challenges put to the subject of an imagined Turing test is "Please write me a sonnet on the subject of the Forth Bridge." The test subject in Turing's paper answers, "Count me out on this one. I never could write poetry." The bridge is included in the video game Grand Theft Auto: San Andreas by Edinburgh-based developer Rockstar North. Renamed the Kincaid Bridge, it serves as the main railway bridge of the fictional city of San Fierro, and appears alongside a virtual Forth Road Bridge.

In his 1917 book On Growth and Form, the mathematical biologist D'Arcy Thompson compares the structural form of the Forth Bridge with the cantilevered skeleton of an ox, the piers corresponding to legs, the cantilevers to the vertebral column:

As heritage
UNESCO inscribed the bridge as a World Heritage Site on 5 July 2015, recognising it as "an extraordinary and impressive milestone in bridge design and construction during the period when railways came to dominate long-distance land travel". It is the sixth World Heritage Site to be inscribed in Scotland. In 2016, a VisitScotland survey voted the Forth Bridge "Scotland's greatest man-made wonder", beating off competition from Stirling Castle, the Caledonian Canal, the Scott Monument, Bell Rock Lighthouse, and Melrose Abbey.

The Forth Bridge has appeared in representation on a 2004 one pound coin, issued by the Royal Mint. The Bridge has also featured on banknotes including the 2007 series issued by the Bank of Scotland, which depicts different bridges in Scotland as examples of Scottish engineering, and the £20 note features the Forth Bridge. In 2014 Clydesdale Bank announced the introduction of Britain's second polymer banknote, a £5 note featuring Sir William Arrol and the Forth Bridge (the first polymer banknote was issued by Northern Bank in 2000). It was introduced in 2015 to commemorate the 125th anniversary of the opening of the bridge, and its nomination to become a UNESCO World Heritage Site.

"Forth Bridge" was used as a codeword to announce to the government the death of Prince Philip, Duke of Edinburgh in 2021.

Visitor attraction 
Network Rail plans to add a visitor centre to the bridge, which would include a viewing platform on top of the North Queensferry side, or a bridge climbing experience to the South Queensferry side. In December 2014 it was announced Arup had been awarded the design contract for the project. In September 2019, Network Rail submitted plans to build a visitor centre at the South Queensferry side that would serve as a base for the bridge climbing experience, dubbed "The Forth Bridge Experience. The plans were approved in early 2020 but were put on hold due to the COVID-19 pandemic. Revised plans were submitted in February 2022.

See also

 Banknotes of Scotland (featured on design)

References

Citations

Bibliography

Further reading

External links

 40 black-and-white photographs of the construction of the Forth Bridge taken in 1886–1887 by Philip Phillips at National Library of Scotland
 Forth Bridge at Forth Bridges Visitor Centre Trust
 
 Scottish Poetry Library: Poetry Map of Scotland (Firth of Forth): The Construction of the Forth Bridge, 1882–1890, by Colin Donati

Bridges completed in 1890
Cantilever bridges
Category A listed buildings in Edinburgh
Category A listed buildings in Fife
Transport in Edinburgh
Railway bridges in Scotland
Listed bridges in Scotland
Historic Civil Engineering Landmarks
World Heritage Sites in Scotland
Bridges in Fife
Bridges in Edinburgh
Firth of Forth
South Queensferry
1890 establishments in the United Kingdom